Sheri Schouten, formerly Sheri Malstrom, is an American Democratic politician and former nurse currently serving in the Oregon House of Representatives. She represents District 27, which covers parts of Washington County and Multnomah County, including central and southern Beaverton, Garden Home–Whitford, Raleigh Hills, and a small part of western Portland.

Biography
Schouten graduated from Oregon Health & Science University in 1981, and worked as a registered nurse until 2016.

In 2016, she was elected to the House to succeed Tobias Read, who retired in order to successfully run for Oregon State Treasurer. She ran unopposed for the seat and received 98% of the vote. In 2018, she was nominated for a second term and faced Independent Party of Oregon nominee Brian Pierson and Libertarian Katy Brumbelow in the November general election. She received 66% of the vote.

Personal life
Schouten was married and widowed with three children prior to seeking political office. In 2017 Washington County Commissioner Dick Schouten proposed to her on the floor of the Oregon Legislature. They were married on July 7, 2018, by Oregon Governor Kate Brown at the historic Belle Ainsworth Jenkins Estate in Aloha.

References

External links
 Campaign website
 Legislative website

Date of birth missing (living people)
Living people
Democratic Party members of the Oregon House of Representatives
American nurses
American women nurses
Politicians from Beaverton, Oregon
Women state legislators in Oregon
21st-century American politicians
Oregon Health & Science University alumni
21st-century American women politicians
Year of birth missing (living people)